KDUN (1030 AM, "Dune Radio") is a radio station in Reedsport, Oregon. Owned by Big Shoes Productions, a company owned by nationally-syndicated radio host Delilah, the station carries an adult contemporary format serving Reedsport and its surrounding communities.

KDUN broadcasts at 50,000 watts in the daytime, the maximum power output permitted by the FCC for AM stations. At night, the station must reduce power to 630 watts to protect KTWO Casper, Wyoming.

History

Launch as KRAF
A construction permit was filed in September 1958 by Oregon Coast Broadcasters for a new standard broadcast station licensed to Reedsport, Oregon with transmitter and studios located on Bolon Island. The construction permit was granted by the Federal Communications Commission (FCC) in March 1960 for a new daytime-only AM station, assigned call letters KRDP, broadcasting with 5,000 watts of power on a frequency of 1470 kHz. A request was made and granted in April 1961 to change to KRAF. Then on June 2, 1961, KRAF began regular broadcasting with Walter J. Kraus as the president and owner of Oregon Coast Broadcasters and Gless Connoy as the station's general manager.  The KRAF callsign represented the "Reedsport and Florence" coverage area of the station. The station was marketed with the slogan, "Listening is heavenly on 1470". The KRAF call letters were first filed for in 1936 by Edwin A. Kraft and licensed to KRAF in Fairbanks, Alaska.

In 1966, Gless Connoy purchased the station outright from Kraus.  Wayne A. Moreland bought KRAF from the Connoy family on July 1, 1968.

Becoming KDUN
Wayne A. Moreland filed for and was granted a call letter change to KDUN in September 1969. Then Moreland's ownership of KRAF would prove short-lived. Brothers Steve and Jerome Kenagy's and J. Westley Morgan of Communications Broadcasting, Inc. were granted transfer of control on February 11, 1972.  The new owners implemented a "middle of the road" music format.  The KDUN call letters have a rich history as they were first assigned in 1921 as the radiotelegraph call sign aboard the ship "Ripple" owned by James T. McAllister. The Kenagy brothers shifted ownership of KDUN in March 1972 to a new company named KDUN Radio, Inc.  The brothers maintained the "middle of the road" music format through the rest of the 1970s.

In August 1973, KDUN was granted a construction permit to move the studio and transmitter site from Bolon Island (located on the site of the former drive-in movie theater) to Lower Smith River Road,  its current transmitter location and the studios moved from the transmitter site into town in the early 1980s.

Move to 1030
In March 1982, the station applied to the FCC for authorization to change their broadcast frequency from 1470 kHz to 1030 kHz, increase daytime signal power to 10,000 watts, and make a few technical changes in their antenna system.  The FCC finally granted the station a construction permit to make those changes on May 7, 1987. KDUN began broadcasting at the lower frequency and higher power in February 1998 and received their license to cover the upgrades on April 18, 1998.

In April 1982, the Kenagy brothers applied to the FCC to transfer ownership of KDUN Radio, Inc., to their now-larger software company, Custom Business System, Inc.  The transfer was approved by the FCC on April 23, 1982.  In November 1985, CBSI announced that it was selling KDUN Radio, Inc., to Lyle and Eleanor A. Irons so that it could focus on the traffic and billing business.  The deal was approved by the FCC on February 11, 1986, and the transaction was consummated on April 23, 1986.

The KLLU years
After a quarter-century of continuous corporate ownership, KDUN Radio, Inc., reached an agreement in June 1997 to sell this station to Shae Partners, LLC.  The deal was approved by the FCC on August 5, 1997, and the transaction was consummated on September 15, 1997.  The station's callsign was changed to KLLU on November 21, 1997.

In July 1999, Shae Partners, LLC, reached an agreement to sell this station to the  Broadcast Development Corporation for $200,000.  The deal was approved by the FCC on August 24, 1999, and the transaction was consummated on August 29, 1999. Less than two weeks later, in early September 1999,  Broadcast Development Corporation reached an agreement to sell this station to Pamplin Communications Corporation subsidiary Pamplin Broadcasting-Oregon, Inc., for $350,000.  The deal was approved by the FCC on October 29, 1999, and the transaction was consummated on November 1, 1999.

Back to KDUN
The station was granted a new construction permit in August 2000, this time to increase the daytime signal to 50,000 watts and the nighttime signal to 630 watts.  KLLU began broadcasting at the higher power in March 2001 and the station received its license to cover the changes on June 18, 2001.  The station was reassigned its heritage KDUN call letters by the Federal Communications Commission on September 25, 2002.

In January 2006, Pamplin Broadcasting-Oregon, Inc., CEO Robert Boisseau Pamplin Jr. reached an agreement to sell this station to Bill Schweitzer, doing business as WKS Broadcasting, Inc., for a cash price of $220,000.  The deal was approved by the FCC on June 5, 2006, and the transaction was consummated on August 29, 2006. At the time of the sale, KDUN was broadcasting a country music format.

KDUN went temporarily silent on November 27, 2007, when the station's owners were unable to pay their electricity bill due to "financial problems with its operations".  According to their April 2008 filing with the FCC, new owners for KDUN were being sought.

In May 2008, WKS Broadcasting, Inc., reached an agreement to sell the station to Sand & Sea Broadcasting, LLC.  The deal was approved by the FCC on June 23, 2008, and the transaction was consummated on August 6, 2008. On September 1, 2013, KDUN was sold to Post Rock Communications, LLC.

Acquisition by Delilah 
On May 3, 2021, Big Shoes Productions, a company owned by station alumnus and nationally-syndicated personality Delilah Rene, acquired KDUN from Post Rock Communications. The purchase, at a price of $60,000, was consummated on June 23, 2021. KDUN announced that it would return to air on September 6, 2021, with an oldies format and focusing on local news and information. A Reedsport native, Rene had originally worked at KDUN in the 1970s as her first job in radio, and saw the purchase as an opportunity to "give back to the community where I grew up". New studios were built in her former fifth grade classroom at what is now the "Oregon Coast School of Arts" in Gardner, Oregon.

KDUN carries the syndicated "Classic Hits" format from Clear Media Networks (which is overseen by Smokey Rivers, who had served as program director and, alongside Delilah, an on-air personality, on Seattle's KSWD). On evenings, the station carries Delilah's  adult contemporary program.

Current Broadcast Schedule:  Monday Thru Friday :"CC" from 6:00AM till 10:00AM. Michelle McCormick 10:00 AM to 1:00 PM.  Bob Larson 1:00 PM to 3:00 PM. Smokey Rivers from 3:00 PM Till 6:00 PM. "Delilah" 6:00 PM till Midnight. Molly Anne Weekends 6AM till 10:00AM.  KDUN broadcasts on AM at 1030 kHz and is also streamed 24/7 on the IHeartRadio app.

Traffic and billing software
In 1975, KDUN's owners were frustrated by the volume of paperwork then required for scheduling advertising, billing advertisers, and producing each day's commercial lineup, they purchased a Wang Laboratories minicomputer and, along with engineer Wes Lockard, invented software to handle these traffic and billing tasks. As the brothers took on these tasks for other stations in the area, they realized that a market for computerized traffic and billing existed and, in 1978, they founded Custom Business Systems, Inc.  At its peak in the mid-1990s, CBSI software was in use by roughly one-third of the commercial radio stations in the United States and by broadcasters in 24 other countries.  In 1999, it was described as the "world's largest supplier of business software for the radio broadcast industry".  CBSI and the Kenagy brothers sold their interest in KDUN in 1985.  CBSI itself is now a part of Marketron Broadcast Solutions.

References

External links
FCC History Cards for KDUN

alaska%22

Radio stations established in 1961
DUN
Mainstream adult contemporary radio stations in the United States
Douglas County, Oregon
1961 establishments in Oregon